Gérard Blain (23 October 1930 – 17 December 2000) was a French actor and film director.

Biography
Blain appeared in sixty films between 1944 and 2000. He also directed nine films between 1971 and 2000. In 1971, he won the Golden Leopard at the Locarno International Film Festival for his film The Friends. Blain married three times, including briefly to Bernadette Lafont.

Filmography

Actor

Director

References

External links

 Obituary, The Guardian https://www.theguardian.com/news/2000/dec/19/guardianobituaries.filmnews

1930 births
2000 deaths
French male film actors
French film directors
French male screenwriters
Male actors from Paris
20th-century French screenwriters
20th-century French male actors
20th-century French male writers